Garafad  or Garafad, is a linear crofting settlement on the east coast of the Trotternish Peninsula  of Skye in the Scottish Highlands and is in the Scottish council area of Highland.

References

External links

Populated places in the Isle of Skye